Frédéric Cattanéo (born 3 December 1978) is a French wheelchair tennis player who competed in international level events. He is a three-time French Open singles quarterfinalist and was the 2012 French Open wheelchair men's doubles champion with Shingo Kunieda. Amputated from both legs after a motorcycle accident, he started wheelchair tennis at the age of 23 in 2002.

He competed in wheelchair tennis at the 2020 Summer Paralympics.

References

External links
 
 
 

1978 births
Living people
French male tennis players
Wheelchair tennis players
French Open champions
Paralympic wheelchair tennis players of France
Paralympic medalists in wheelchair tennis
Medalists at the 2012 Summer Paralympics
Wheelchair tennis players at the 2012 Summer Paralympics
Wheelchair tennis players at the 2016 Summer Paralympics
Wheelchair tennis players at the 2020 Summer Paralympics
Moroccan emigrants to France
Sportspeople from Le Mans